Raja Sir Joginder Sen Bahadur KCSI (20 August 1904 – 16 June 1986) was the last ruling Raja of Mandi State, and was subsequently a diplomat and Member of Parliament.

Life
Joginder Sen succeeded to the Mandi throne on 28 April 1913, aged eight. On 18 February 1925, he received an honorary commission as a lieutenant in the British Indian Army. Knighted as a Knight Commander of the Order of the Star of India (KCSI) in the 1931 New Year Honours list, he was promoted to honorary captain on 26 September 1931 and to honorary major on 24 December 1938. He received his final promotion to honorary lieutenant-colonel on 15 October 1946, and received an honorary commission in the same rank in the post-Independence Indian Army on 18 January 1951.

After serving as Ambassador to Brazil, Raja Joginder Sen represented the Mandi constituency in the Lok Sabha from 1957 to 1962.

He was married to Amrit Kaur Sahiba

References

|-

1904 births
1986 deaths
20th-century Indian monarchs
Knights Commander of the Order of the Star of India
Indian knights
Indian National Congress politicians from Punjab, India
Indian National Congress politicians from Himachal Pradesh
Lok Sabha members from Punjab, India
India MPs 1957–1962